Mahmud Pasha or Mahmut Pasha may refer to:

People
 Mahmud Pasha Angelovic (1420–1474), Ottoman grand vizier (1456–68, 1472–74)
 Mahmud Pasha (governor) (died 1567), Ottoman governor of Yemen (1561–65) and Egypt (1566–67)
 Kara Mahmud Bushati, Pasha of Scutari (1778–96)
 Mahmud Dramali Pasha (c. 1780–1822), Ottoman governor of Morea
 Mahmud Nedim Pasha (c. 1818–1883), Ottoman grand vizier (1871–72, 1875–76)
 Mahmud Shevket Pasha (1856–1913), Ottoman grand vizier (1913), war minister, general, and founder of the Ottoman Air Force
 Çürüksulu Mahmud Pasha (1864–1931), Ottoman statesman, naval minister, and general
 Mahmud Kâmil Pasha (1880–1922), Ottoman general
 Mahmud Muhtar Pasha (1867–1935), Ottoman and Turkish soldier and diplomat
 Muhammad Mahmoud Pasha (1877–1941), two-time prime minister of Egypt
 Mahmud Pasha (admiral), mid 19th-century Ottoman grand admiral

Places
 Zal Mahmud Pasha Mosque, an old Ottoman mosque located near the Eyüp Sultan Mosque in the Eyüp district of Istanbul, Turkey

See also
 Mehmed Pasha (disambiguation)
 Mahmud
 Pasha